Charter Vocational High School was a public school in Albuquerque. The school's superintendent is Danny Moon.

Demographics
The Grades 9-12 High School had 265 students and opened in August 2002. Closed in May 2007. It will live on in its graduates.

Distinctive Features
Students at Charter Vocational High School were engaged in a half-day vocational program. They may attend on-site laboratory classes such as auto mechanics, construction, computer aided drafting, or marketing. Some are concurrently enrolled at Albuquerque Technical Vocational Institute while others participate directly through actual work experience. Business connections are being established to provide pre-apprenticeships and post-high school training programs.

Alumni 
 Matthew Liguori - Valedictorian
 Samuel Lujan -  salutatorian

References

Defunct schools in New Mexico
Buildings and structures in Bernalillo County, New Mexico